The 2017 Cork Senior Hurling Championship was the 129th staging of the Cork Senior Hurling Championship since its establishment by the Cork County Board in 1887. The draw for the 2017 fixtures took place on 11 December 2016. The championship began on 6 May 2017 and ended on 22 October 2017.

Glen Rovers were the defending champions, however, they were defeated by Na Piarsaigh in Round 4.

On 22 October 2017, Imokilly won the championship following a 3-13 to 0-18 defeat of Blackrock in the final. This was their third championship title and their first in 19 championship seasons.

Bandon's Ronan Crowley was the championship's top scorer with 2-54.

Teams

A total of 26 teams contested the Senior Championship, including 25 teams from the 2016 senior championship and one promoted from the 2016 premier intermediate championship.

Team changes

To Championship

Promoted from the Cork Premier Intermediate Hurling Championship
 Bandon

Results

Preliminary round

Round 1

Round 2A

Round 2B

Round 3

Round 4

Relegation play-offs

Quarter-finals

Semi-finals

Final

Championship statistics

Scoring

Top scorers overall

Top scorers in a single game

Miscellaneous

 The semi-final between Blackrock and Na Piarsaigh is the first senior championship match to be played at the newly-refurbished Páirc Uí Chaoimh. It is the first senior match played at the venue since 2014.
 Imokilly qualify for the final for the first time since 2001 while Blackrock qualify for the final for the first time since 2003.
 Imokilly win the title for the first time since 1998. They also become the first divisional since then to win the title. 
 Youghal become the first team to be relegated from the championship since Courcey Rovers in 2014.
 Bandon make their first appearance at senior level.

External links

 Cork GAA website

References

Cork Senior Hurling Championship
Cork